Herz Jesu Fechenheim (Sacred Heart, literally: Heart of Jesus, German: Herz-Jesu-Kirche) is a  Catholic church in the suburb Fechenheim of Frankfurt am Main, Hesse, Germany. The parish church of the Fechenheim congregation is part of the Roman Catholic Diocese of Limburg. On 1 January 2015 the parish became a Kirchort (church location), part of the parish St. Josef Frankfurt am Main.

Logos

History 
The church was built from 1895 to 1896 after a design by the architect  in Gothic revival style. It was consecrated on 4 May 1896. Fechenheim was then independent and belonged to the Diocese of Fulda. When Fechenheim became part of Frankfurt in 1929, it came to the Diocese of Limburg.

The church was damaged by the bombing of Frankfurt on 2 March 1944. It was rebuilt with simpler interior style. In a renovation in 1984/85, part of the original interior design was restored, including vaults in one of the two naves.

On 1 January 2015, four parishes were combined to St. Josef, with locations (Kirchort) , Maria Rosenkranz, Heilig Geist and Herz Jesu.

References

External links 

 
 St. Josef Frankfurt am Main

Roman Catholic churches in Frankfurt
Churches in the Diocese of Limburg